Hermann Friedrich Waesemann (6 June 1813 – 28 January 1879) was a German architect.

He was born in Danzig (Gdańsk), the son of an architect. He studied mathematics and science in Bonn from 1830 to 1832, before going to Berlin to study architecture at the Bauakademie. His main work is the Rotes Rathaus in Berlin.

Waesemann died in Berlin and is buried at the Friedhof II der Sophiengemeinde Berlin.

1813 births
1879 deaths
19th-century German architects
University of Bonn alumni
People from Gdańsk